Ákos Elekfy (born 2 April 1923) was a Hungarian speed skater. He competed in two events at the 1948 Winter Olympics.

References

External links
 

1923 births
Possibly living people
Hungarian male speed skaters
Olympic speed skaters of Hungary
Speed skaters at the 1948 Winter Olympics
Place of birth missing (living people)